Cobden is a small community in the Township of Whitewater Region, in Renfrew County, Ontario, Canada.

History
The area around Cobden was originally inhabited by the Nibachis, a sub-division of the native, Algonquian speaking, tribes of North America.

Champlain's astrolabe

In 1613, French explorer Samuel de Champlain, travelled through an area very near Cobden while exploring the Ottawa River. Due to the Chenaux Rapids, Champlain and his men were forced to portage. They presumably took shore in Browns Bay near present-day McKenzie's Hill. In 1953, a large rock was found in this area bearing a chiseled inscription. Though the inscription was hard to read, it was determined that it said, "Champlain Juin 2, 1613". Champlain's trail from this point is debatable. He may have cut straight across land to the southern tip of Jeffreys Lake, or he may have veered south, skirting the far side of what later came to be known as the Champlain Trail Lakes. It is known that he eventually made his way to Green Lake and at this point, according to several 19th-century authors, Champlain lost his astrolabe. It stayed there for 254 years, until it was found in 1867 by Edward George Lee, a 14-year-old farm boy helping his father clear trees near Green Lake (now Astrolabe Lake). Edward gave the astrolabe to Captain Cowley, a Steamboat Captain on Muskrat Lake; Lee never received the ten dollars Cowley promised him, and Cowley sold the astrolabe to his employer, President of the Ottawa Forwarding Company, R.W. Cassels. The astrolabe eventually passed to Samuel V. Hoffman of the New York Historical Society in 1942, remaining there for 47 years, until acquired by the Department of Communications for the Canadian Museum of Civilization in 1989.

In 1990, a special celebration was held in Cobden in honour of the astrolabe's return.

Although it cannot be conclusively proven that the astrolabe found near this Lake indeed belonged to Champlain, the following facts should be taken into consideration:
 The bottom portion of the astrolabe is engraved 1603, the same year Champlain was commissioned "geographer Royal" to Henry IV on his first voyage to Canada.
 Champlain's reading at Gould's Landing erred by 1 degree. Subsequent readings recorded at Alumette Island also erred 1 degree.
 Apart from this reading at Alumette Island, Champlain does not enter readings for the remainder of his expedition.
 It was not unusual for Champlain to omit recording events and conditions in his journal. He was considered a laconic journalist who only dealt with facts he considered important.
 Finally, by 1611, the astrolabe had been largely replaced by the vernier scale which was considered to be far more accurate.

Founding and development

Early years
Cobden's very existence is a circumstance of location. As Pembroke and Ottawa grew so, it seemed, did the gap between them. In the 1800s the easiest route between the two was the Ottawa River. However, the presence of rapids near Portage du Fort necessitated a land route. At this time the area was mostly a vast forest untouched by Europeans. A few settlers had put down near muskrat lake, (John Parsons, John Sheriff, Spencer Allen, Robert Allen, and others) but for the most part there had been little activity since Champlain's visit in the 17th century. Then in 1849 Jason Gould built a road from what came to be called Goulds Landing to what would become Cobden on Muskrat lake. One could catch a steamer down the lake and then go on by road to Pembroke. The traffic on the road couldn't help but cause growth. In 1850 Gould built a Post Office and named the fledgling settlement Cobden after Richard Cobden, member of British Parliament, whom Gould admired. By October 2, 1876, the railway had crept its way to Cobden. The community started to expand from the lake towards the railway station further inland. Main Street began to take shape, The Cobden Sun, The Bank of Ottawa, black smith shops, a bakery, general store, mill, surgeon and jewelry store. In 1880 A public school was opened to accommodate the strain on nearby S.S.No 1. Cobden was soon the biggest community in Ross Township and became an Incorporated Village in October 1901.

1901-present
Cobden has been the victim of many fires. This has destroyed almost all of the original buildings. Main Street has suffered worst from fire including one in 1913 which destroyed the Cobden Sun building and many historical records. A hydro electric dam began operating at the falls south of Cobden. It supplied the town, off and on, with power until it was destroyed, April 12, 1934, in a raging flood. Large blocks of ice ripped the dam apart and poured over Highway 17, tearing away sections of pavement. The plant operator, Mr. Bill Wall, was stranded in the upper section of their house until flooding subsided. The town then started receiving power from a station in Calabogie. Council elections in 1949 were dominated by the issue of whether or not to hold another plebiscite on establishing a waterworks system. A previous plebiscite had come out 82–56 against. But times were changing quickly; after the war a new council was elected and the next vote was 124–46 in favour and by the early 1950s Cobden had water. The waterworks system required constant maintenance up until a major retooling in the 1980s. The visibly dominating water tower was built in 1988 replacing the original (built in 1951).

A bigger school was needed by 1903. The present-day school, Cobden District Public, was built in 1938 and initially served as a high school until Opeongo High School was built.

In 2001, the Village of Cobden was amalgamated with the Village of Beachburg, the Township of Ross and the Township of Westmeath to form the Township of Whitewater Region.

Today, Cobden's location on the busy Trans-Canada Highway, known as Highway 17, makes it a convenient stopping place for the many travelers passing through the area.

Demographics and culture
In 1991 Cobden had a population of 1026. In 1996 Cobden had a population of 1,020. The population of the town decreased by 0.58%.

Occupying 1.85 km of land, Cobden has a population density of 551.351 people per square km

Cobden is host to its own annual fair and is held in late August each year. Established in 1854, The Cobden Fair offers several days of activities that include exhibits, cattle, horse and sheep shows, midway rides and a demolition derby. During the holiday season, it has its own Santa Claus Parade. From May until October, located at the Cobden fairgrounds, and offering fresh local grown produce, homemade baking and a wide assortment of crafts is one of the best farmers' markets in the Ottawa Valley.

The Farmers' Market
Organized in 1991. The Farmers' Market is an outdoor market that runs from May to October. It offers a wide variety of crafts and foodstuffs and everything must be grown or handmade locally. The market has recently moved from the Memorial Hall grounds to the Fair Grounds but the Christmas Market, the grande finale for the year, is still held in the Memorial Hall

Cobden Park
Overlooking Muskrat Lake the park occupies what is thought to be the spot where Champlain met the Native Chief Nibachis. A plaque was erected in the 1960s commemorating this. The lands for the park were donated by Thomas Robinson and his wife in 1904. In 1988 extensive work was carried out on the beach portion of the park by the Civitans.

Bruce McPhail Memorial Airport
Home to The Champlain Flying Club, the Cobden airport is just south of the village on Highway 17.

Logos Land
Located about 5 miles east of Cobden, Logos Land is a religious based water park. Built on the site of the Astrolabe's discovery, Logos Land features five water slides, paddle boats, mini-golf and a representation of Noah's Ark. The water park is open mid-June to Labour Day, but Noah's Ark is open year-round. It's also home to Canada's tallest Christmas tree, standing 22 meters high. Every year over 3000 local children decorate the tree, which is dedicated to children around the world.

Mussie
Mussie is a Nessie-like creature said to reside in Muskrat Lake. It most likely doesn't exist, and if it does, is more likely a sturgeon.
A handmade wooden tribute to Mussie can be found in front of the local Home Hardware Store.  It stands 3 meters high and approximately 12 feet long, built by previous store owner Doug Schauer.

OVPC
Ottawa Valley Pentecostal Camp is a Christian based family and children's camp at the bottom of Muskrat Lake. It has hosted many local community events with its year round facilities.  Members of surrounding churches in the Ottawa area rent out trailers and stay at camp during the summer. OVPC is owned and operated by the Pentecostal Assemblies of Canada.

Notable people
Susie Laska, hockey player for the NWHL
Robert Wellington Mayhew, the first Canadian ambassador to Japan
Delbert Lippert, Honorary Colonel, 427 Special Operations Aviation Squadron - http://www.427squadron.com/news_file/lippert_bio_official.html
Jack Quinn, National Hockey League Player, drafted 8th overall in the 2020 NHL Draft by the Buffalo Sabres
Al Ritchie, Canadian football Hall of Famer

References

https://web.archive.org/web/20040908081000/http://reis.agr.ca/rlrs/soil_surveys/renfrew/N_area_information.htm
History of Township of Ross, Prepared by: Herbert Ross
The Upper Ottawa Valley Glimpse of History by: Clyde C. Kennedy
Cobden Then and Now by: George A. Wallace

External links
https://web.archive.org/web/20051125142424/http://www.whitewaterregion.ca/communities/cobden.htm
http://ca.epodunk.com/profiles/ontario/cobden/2003696.html
http://www.civilization.ca/tresors/treasure/222eng.html
https://web.archive.org/web/20061113131811/http://www.canada.com/ottawa/ottawacitizen/specials/etiennebrule/story.html?id=2c255d9b-e994-4ac2-985d-614a1fce20b8

Communities in Renfrew County
Former villages in Ontario
Populated places disestablished in 2001